The basket-hilted sword is a sword type of the early modern era characterised by a basket-shaped guard that protects the hand. The basket hilt is a development of the quillons added to swords' crossguards since the Late Middle Ages.
In modern times, this variety of sword is also sometimes referred to as the broadsword.

The basket-hilted sword was generally in use as a military sword, in contrast with the rapier, the slim duelling sword worn with civilian dress during the same period, although each did find some use in both military and civilian contexts. A further distinction applied by arms historians and collectors is that a true broadsword possesses a double-edged blade, while similar wide-bladed swords with a single sharpened edge and a thickened back are called backswords. Various forms of basket-hilt were mounted on both broadsword and backsword blades.

Morphology
The basket-hilted sword is a development of the 16th century, rising to popularity in the 17th century and remaining in widespread use throughout the 18th century, used especially by heavy cavalry up to the Napoleonic era.

One of the earliest basket-hilted swords was recovered from the wreck of the Mary Rose, an English warship lost in 1545. Before the find, the earliest positive dating had been two swords from around the time of the English Civil War. At first the wire guard was a simple design but as time passed it became increasingly sculpted and ornate.

The basket-hilted sword was a cut and thrust sword which found the most use in a military context, contrasting with the rapier, the similarly heavy, thrust-oriented sword most often worn with civilian dress which evolved from the espada ropera or spada da lato type during the same period. The term "broadsword" was used in the 17th and 18th centuries, referring to double-edged basket-hilted swords. The term was introduced to distinguish these cut and thrust swords from the smaller and narrower smallsword.

By the 17th century there were regional variations of basket-hilts: the Walloon hilt, the Sinclair hilt, schiavona, mortuary sword, Scottish broadsword, and some types of eastern European pallasches.
The mortuary and claybeg variants were commonly used in the British isles, whether domestically produced or acquired through trade with Italy and Germany. They also influenced the 18th-century cavalry sabre.

During the 18th century, the fashion of duelling in Europe focused on the lighter small sword, and fencing with the broadsword came to be seen as a speciality of Scotland. A number of fencing manuals teaching fencing with the Scottish broadsword were published throughout the 18th century.

Descendants of the basket-hilted sword, albeit in the form of backswords with reduced "half" or "three-quarter" baskets, remained in use in cavalry during the Napoleonic era and throughout the 19th century, specifically as the 1796 Heavy Cavalry Sword, the Gothic Hilted British Infantry Swords of the 1820s to 1890s, the 1897 Pattern British Infantry Officer's Sword and as the Pattern 1908 and 1912 cavalry swords down to the eve of World War I. One of the last active use of the scottish broadsword in war was in World War II by Major Jack Churchill.

Subtypes

Schiavona
The Schiavona was a Renaissance sword that became popular in Italy during the 16th and 17th centuries. Stemming from the 16th-century sword of the Balkan mercenaries who formed the bodyguard of the Doge of Venice, the name came from the fact that the guard consisted largely of the Schiavoni, Istrian and Dalmatian Slavs. It was widely recognizable for its "cat's-head pommel" and distinctive handguard made up of many leaf-shaped brass or iron bars that were attached to the cross-bar and knucklebow rather than the pommel.

Classified as a true broadsword, this war sword had a wider blade than its contemporary civilian rapiers. While a rapier is primarily a thrusting sword, a schiavona is a cut and thrust sword that has extra weight for greater penetration. It was basket-hilted (often with an imbedded quillon for an upper guard) and its blade was double edged. A surviving blade measures 93.2 cm × 3.4 cm × 0.45 cm and bears two fullers or grooves running about 1/4 the length of the blade. Weighing in at around 1.1 kg, this blade was useful for both cut and thrust.

The schiavona became popular among the armies of those who traded with Italy during the 17th century and was the weapon of choice for many heavy cavalry. It was popular among mercenary soldiers and wealthy civilians alike; examples decorated with gilding and precious stones were imported by the upper classes to be worn as a combination of fashion accessory and defensive weapon.

Mortuary sword
A similar weapon was the cut-and-thrust mortuary sword which was used after 1625 by cavalry during the English Civil War. This (usually) two-edged sword sported a half-basket hilt with a straight blade some 90–105 cm long. These hilts were often of very intricate sculpting and design.

After the execution of King Charles I (1649), basket-hilted swords were made which depicted the face or death mask of the "martyred" king on the hilt. These swords came to be known as "mortuary swords", and the term has been extended to refer to the entire type of Civil War–era broadswords by some 20th-century authors.

This sword was Oliver Cromwell's weapon of choice; the one he owned is now held by the Royal Armouries, and displayed at the Tower of London. Mortuary swords remained in use until around 1670 when they fell out of favor among civilians and began to be replaced with the smallsword.

Scottish broadsword

A common weapon among the clansmen during the Jacobite rebellions of the late 17th and early 18th centuries was the Scottish basket hilted broadsword, commonly known as claidheamh mor or claymore meaning "great sword" in Gaelic. Some authors suggest that claybeg should be used instead, from a purported Gaelic claidheamh beag "small sword". This does not parallel Scottish Gaelic usage. According to the Gaelic Dictionary by R. A. Armstrong (1825), claidheamh mór "big/great sword" translates to "broadsword", and claidheamh dà làimh to "two-handed sword", while claidheamh beag "small sword" is given as a translation of "Bilbo".

Sinclair Hilt
The "Sinclair Hilt" is the name given by Victorian antiquarians, in the late 19th century, to Scandinavian swords that "bear a certain resemblance" to swords used in the Scottish Highlands in the 17th and 18th centuries. They named the sword for George Sinclair, a Scottish mercenary who died in Sweden (d. 1612).

Walloon sword
The so-called walloon sword (épée wallone) or haudegen (hewing sword) was common in Germany, Switzerland, the Netherlands and Scandinavia in the Thirty Years' War and Baroque era. The historian and sword typologist Ewart Oakeshott proposed an English origin for this type of sword, with subsequent development in the Netherlands and Germany.
Basket-hilted rapiers and sword-rapiers, characterised by pierced shell-guards, made during the same period are known as Pappenheimer rapiers.

The Walloon sword was favoured by both the military and civilian gentry. A distinctive feature of the Walloon sword is the presence of a thumb-ring, and it was therefore not ambidextrous. The most common hilt type featured a double shell guard and half-basket, though examples exist with hand protection ranging from a shell and single knuckle-bow to a full basket. The hilt may have influenced the design of 18th century continental hunting hangers.

Following their campaign in the Netherlands in 1672 (when many of these German-made swords were captured from the Dutch), the French began producing this weapon as their first regulation sword. Weapons of this design were also issued to the Swedish army from the time of Gustavus Adolphus until as late as the 1850s.

See also
 Backsword
 Claymore
 Elizabethan fencing
 Historical fencing in Scotland
 Pata (sword), similar guarding concept
 Swiss arms and armour

Notes

References
 C. Martyn, The British Cavalry Sword from 1800, Pen and Sword Books, Barnsley (2004).
 R. E. Oakeshott, European weapons and armour: From the Renaissance to the industrial revolution (1980).

External links

  Scottish basket-hilted swords in the National Museum of Scotland, Kelvingrove Art Gallery and Museum, and the Trades House of Glasgow.
 The basket-hilted sword. Description and photos (interestingswords.com)
 Schiavona – Venetian basket-hilted sword (interestingswords.com)

Early Modern European swords